Teruel (Catalan: Terol ) is a province of Aragon, in the northeast of Spain. The capital is Teruel.

It is bordered by the provinces of Tarragona, Castellón, Valencia (including its exclave Rincón de Ademuz), Cuenca, Guadalajara, and Zaragoza. The area of the province is 14,809 km². Its population is 134,572 (2018), of whom about a quarter live in the capital, and its population density is 9.36/km². It contains 236 municipalities, of which more than half are villages of under 200 people. Teruel is the second-least populated province of Spain, also the second smallest in population density after Soria.

The main language throughout the province is Spanish (with official status), although Catalan is spoken in a northeastern area bordering Catalonia.

Geography
This province is located in the mountainous Sistema Ibérico area. The main ranges in the province of Teruel are Sierra de la Virgen, Sierra de Santa Cruz, Sierra de Cucalón, Sierra de San Just, Sierra Carrascosa, Sierra Menera, Sierra Palomera, Sierra de Javalambre, Sierra de Gúdar, Sierra de Albarracín and the Montes Universales, among others.

Depopulation and neglect
Most of the Teruel Province has undergone massive depopulation since the middle of the 20th century. This situation is shared with other areas in Spain, particularly with those near the Iberian mountain range (much of the provinces of Soria, Guadalajara and Cuenca) and with other areas in Aragón.

The exodus from the rural mountain areas in Teruel rose after General Franco's Plan de Estabilización in 1959. The population declined steeply as people migrated towards the industrial areas and the large cities in Spain, leaving behind their small villages where living conditions were often harsh, with cold winters and very basic facilities.

As a consequence there are many ghost towns in different parts of the province.

A great number of surviving towns in Teruel province have only a residual population, reviving somewhat during the summer when a few city-dwellers spend their holidays there. Other causes of the strong emigration have been the low productivity of traditional agricultural practices, like sheep and goat farming, the closing of mines, like the large Sierra Menera mine near Ojos Negros, as well as the lifestyle changes that swept over rural Spain during the second half of the 20th century.

The "Teruel Exists" movement began at the turn of the 21st century. It is a platform of provincial authorities, institutions and sympathizers seeking to reverse the long-standing neglect of this province.

Population development
The historical population is given in the following chart:

Comarcas 
The following Comarcas of Aragon are located in Teruel Province:
 Bajo Martín 
 Jiloca
 Cuencas Mineras
 Andorra-Sierra de Arcos
 Bajo Aragón
 Comunidad de Teruel
 Maestrazgo
 Sierra de Albarracín Comarca
 Gúdar-Javalambre
 Matarranya

Notable people
 Luis Buñuel, film director from Calanda
 Gaspar Sanz, music composer from Calanda
 Antón García Abril, music composer
 Pablo Serrano, sculptor from Crivillén
 Luis Milla, retired footballer who played for CD Teruel, FC Barcelona and R. Madrid
 David Civera, light music singer
 Federico Jiménez Losantos, author, journalist and radio host
 Manuel Pizarro Moreno, businessman, politician and jurist

See also
La Vaquilla del Ángel
List of Aragonese comarcas
List of municipalities in Teruel
Lower Aragon
Sistema Ibérico
MotorLand Aragón

Notes and references

External links 

 Teruel.org 
 Teruel Info. – Caciquismo & desarrollismo – N.B. This text-only website is in Japanese. Content not clear.
 Teruel Digital
 Directory in dmoz.org
 Fundación Amantes de Teruel
 Estado de los embalses de Teruel
 Teruel.com – Tourism 
 Deteruel.com — Comunidad virtual de Teruel
El número de ancianos españoles aumenta un 20% en 13 años